Fausto Tosi (born 20 October 1962) is an Italian weightlifter. He competed in the men's light heavyweight event at the 1988 Summer Olympics.

References

1962 births
Living people
Italian male weightlifters
Olympic weightlifters of Italy
Weightlifters at the 1988 Summer Olympics
Sportspeople from Verona
20th-century Italian people